The Mecklenburg Class G 2, formerly Class VIII, were goods train locomotives with the Grand Duchy of Mecklenburg Friedrich-Franz Railway. They were built for the route between Güstrow and Neubrandenburg with its steep inclines.

The engines had crossed Hall cranks (gekreuzte Hallschen Kurbeln), an outside frame, Gooch valve gear and a steam dome towards the front. The boilers on all the surviving engines were replaced between 1892 and 1897. In 1895 only four were still in the fleet. The last one was withdrawn around the turn of the 20th century.

See also 
Grand Duchy of Mecklenburg Friedrich-Franz Railway
List of Mecklenburg locomotives

References 
 

0-6-0 locomotives
G 2
Railway locomotives introduced in 1864
C n2 locomotives
Sächsische Maschinenfabrik locomotives

Freight locomotives